Cleveland Smith (September 1853 – January 12, 1935) was an American politician in the state of Washington. He served in the Washington House of Representatives from 1895 to 1899.

References

Members of the Washington House of Representatives
Washington (state) Populists
1853 births
1935 deaths